The Theban Tomb known as MMA 507 is located in Deir el-Bahari. It forms part of the Theban Necropolis, situated on the west bank of the Nile opposite Luxor. The tomb is the burial place of approximately 60 slain soldiers dating to the 12th Dynasty. 

The tomb was discovered by Herbert Eustis Winlock in 1923. It is located near the tomb of Kheti, the chancellor. The tomb had been robbed in antiquity and a pile of remains was found. The soldiers died from arrow wounds. Winlock commented that none of the bodies showed the trauma of hand-to-hand combat. Names of the soldiers included Ameny, Sebekhotep, Sebeknakht, Intef, Intefoker, Mentuhotep, and Senwosret. Winlock dated the tomb to the 11th Dynasty.

The date of the tomb was reassessed by Vogel. The current thinking is that the tomb dates to the 12th dynasty, likely from the time of Senusret I.

See also 
 List of MMA Tombs

References 

Theban tombs